Southgate station may refer to:

Southgate station (Edmonton), a light rail station in Alberta, Canada
Southgate tube station, an underground rail station in London, England